The Herreshoff 31, also called the Cat Ketch 31, is an American sailboat that was designed by Halsey Chase Herreshoff as a cruiser and first built in 1979.

Production
The design was built by Cat Ketch Corp. in the United States from 1979 to 1986, with 100 examples completed, but it is now out of production.

Design
The Herreshoff 31 is a recreational keelboat, built predominantly of fiberglass and polyurethane over wood, with wood trim. It displaces  and carries  of lead ballast.

The boat is fitted with an Italian Nanni Industries or Japanese Yanmar diesel engine for docking and maneuvering.

The space below decks is large, and lacks a forward bulkhead between the main cabin and the forward cabin. The galley is located to starboard and includes a two-burner stove. The head is to port at the foot of the companionway stairs, opposite the galley.

Sleeping accommodation consists of a forward "V"-berth in the bow and two double bunks in the main cabin, with a stowable table in-between them. The berths all have draw stowage underneath them.

The unstayed rigging features a simple layout, with only an outhaul, halyard, downhaul and sheets for each loose-footed sail. The booms are high and on the starboard side of each sail. The boat can be sailed on one sail or both and with either reefed. The staysail can be raised on the aft mast in lighter air. The masts are designed to flex to shed excess wind loads. There are no winches for the sheets and none are required.

Operational history
In a review of the Herreshoff 31, Richard Sherwood noted, "the popularity of cat-ketches is due to the ease with which they can be sailed. Masts are usually unstayed and running rigging is simple. Tacking does not have to involve sail handling. Many of these boats have a fairly high ballast/displacement ratio, are good (though not excellent) sailers on all points, and have a lot of room below."

See also
List of sailing boat types

Similar sailboats
Allmand 31
Beneteau 31
Catalina 310
Corvette 31
Douglas 31
Hunter 31
Hunter 31-2
Hunter 310
Hunter 320
Marlow-Hunter 31
Niagara 31
Tanzer 31

References

Keelboats
1970s sailboat type designs
Sailing yachts
Sailboat type designs by Halsey Herreshoff
Sailboat types built by Cat Ketch Corp.